Trinity Episcopal Church Complex is a historic Episcopal church complex at 335 Fourth Avenue in Mount Vernon, Westchester County, New York. It is two blocks south of its mother church, Saint Paul's Church. The complex consists of the church (1859), old parish hall (1892), new parish hall (1909; 1954), and rectory (1893).  The church, old parish hall, and new parish hall are connected to form an "L" shaped building.  The church was designed by Henry Dudley and built in the Gothic Revival style and enlarged and substantially redecorated in the 1880s. It is a one-story masonry structure with a steeply pitched, slate covered gable roof.

It was added to the National Register of Historic Places in 1997. The church closed in 2016.

See also
National Register of Historic Places listings in southern Westchester County, New York

References

Episcopal church buildings in New York (state)
Churches on the National Register of Historic Places in New York (state)
National Register of Historic Places in Westchester County, New York
Mount Vernon, New York
Gothic Revival church buildings in New York (state)
Churches completed in 1859
19th-century Episcopal church buildings
Churches in Westchester County, New York